The Pan American Team is one of the teams under the auspices of the USA Basketball organization. The Pan American Games are held every four years in the year before the Olympics. The first Pan American Games were held in 1951, but those games were men only. The second Pan American games in 1955 included women's teams. Eligible teams are the members of FIBA Americas. The USA has participated every year since the 1955 event, except for 1995, when the game were canceled, due to too few teams committed to play.

Participants in the Pan American games included the very best ever to be part of the sport–ten players ended up in the Naismith Hall of Fame, including Cheryl Miller, Nancy Lieberman and Lusia Harris.  Hall of Fame members Jody Conradt, Billie Moore, Cathy Rush, C. Vivian Stringer and Kay Yow were coaches for Pan American teams, while Denise Curry and Pat Summitt participated both as players and coaches.

History

AAU era
In the early years of the Pan American (Pan Am) games, the players came from the AAU teams. The players for the 1955 team were drawn primarily from Hanes Hosiery Mills, Wayland College Flying Queens, the Dons, and Dowells Dolls. These four teams played each other in a tournament to help select the players for the Pan Am team. Hanes Hosiery came in first ahead of Wayland Baptist. This result would not be surprising, as these were the two dominant teams of the era. Hanes Hosiery won the AAU national championship in 1951, 1952, and 1953, beating Wayland two of those three years, and Wayland would go on to win the national championship the net four years 1954–1957. Not surprisingly, the twelve player Pan American team was dominated by these two teams, with six Wayland Baptist players and three from Hanes Hosiery. While Wayland provided the largest number of players, Hanes provided the captain, Lurlyne Greer Mealhouse, who would score over 18 points per game, more than twice the second highest scorer, and still the third highest scoring average in Pan American history. Greer was considered to be the best AAU player of her era.

The 1959 team continued to draw from AAU ranks, with even more participation from the dominant team of the era, Wayland Baptist College. The team that year was largely made up of the Wayland Baptist team, including the head coach Harley Redin, and a few stars from other teams. The USA team would go on to win all eight games and the gold medal. The AAU influence would continue through 1971, with players from teams like the Raytown Piperettes, and St. Joseph's Pepsi-Cola, along with multiple representatives from the Nashville Business College and Wayland Baptist teams. The coaches were also drawn from these ranks, with Nashville Business College's John Head as head coach in 1963, and a second stint at head coach by Harley Redin in 1971. The USA team was dominant in the beginning, winning the gold medal in their first three appearances, then settled for the silver medal in 1967 and 1971, with the latter team being led by Linda Gamble.

College era
Although many of the players on earlier teams were playing at colleges, the competitions were organized by the AAU. Over time, the emphasis shifted to college organizations. The Commission on Intercollegiate Athletics for Women started in 1967, then evolved into the Association for Intercollegiate Athletics for Women in 1971. With the enactment of Title IX in 1972, the growth of women's sports in general, and women's basketball in particular, grew significantly in this era. The AIAW organized national championships starting in 1972, and the USA Basketball teams increasing drew from the ranks of the AIAW members.

In 1975, the Pan Am team included players such as Nancy Lieberman, Lusia Harris, Pat Head, and Ann Meyers, and coach Cathy Rush, each of whom would be inducted into the Naismith Memorial Basketball Hall of Fame. The gold medal winning 1975 team was especially dominant, winning all seven games convincingly. The closest game was the final against Brazil, and that game was won by the USA team 74–55.

The 1979 team, with Pat Head now coaching instead of playing, had high hopes to repeat as gold medal winners. Virtually the same team had won the gold at the world Championships, and the gold at the Jones Cup competition. however, the final game pitted undefeated USA against undefeated Cuba, and the Cuban team prevailed, 91–86.

The 1983 team returned to gold medal form, winning all five games in Caracas, Venezuela. The scoring leaders were Cheryl Miller, Lynette Woodard at 19.8 and 19.0 points per game, respectively. The team also included Anne Donovan and Kim Mulkey, now better known as coaches.

Record

2011
The 2011 Pan American Games in Guadalajara, Jalisco, Mexico  began on 14 October, but the women's basketball events commenced on the 21st. The team practiced in Texas, and left for Mexico on the 18th of October. The head coach of the USA team was Ceal Barry, from the University of Colorado,  who was assisted by Jennifer Gillom and Debbie Ryan.

USA versus Argentina
The USA team fell to Argentina 58-55 in their opening match. The USA team opened strong, ending the first period with a 14-point lead, but the USA team let up, and the Argentines closed the half with a 15-5 run which cut the margin to four. There were six lead changes in the final quarter, but when the USA team failed to convert a layup in the final seconds of the game which would have tied the score, the USA team was forced to foul, and the team from Argentina won by three points. 
Despite the loss, there were some individual highlights. Breanna Stewart is the only high school player on the team, and the only high school player on a Pan Am team other than Nancy Lieberman. Despite being younger than her teammates, Stewart scored 18 points and pulled down 21 rebounds, setting a Pan Am record for a USA player. Katelan Redmon hit six of her eleven shots to score 16 points for the USA team.

USA versus Puerto Rico
The USA team lost against Puerto Rico 75-70, in a game that was tied in the fourth quarter. The USA team easily won the rebounding battle 44-28, and shot slightly better than Puerto Rico (38% versus 37%), but had eight more turnovers.
 
The USA team started strong, scoring the first five points of the game, and extending the lead to 19-5 in the first quarter. However, the USA team only managed eight points in the second quarter, and the half came to a close with the score tied at 33 points apiece. Breanna Stewart had a double-double, with a team high 14 points, and eleven rebounds, tying her with Shante Evans for the rebounding honors.

The second loss eliminates the USA from medal contention, not only stopping the team from defending the 2007 Gold Medal, but removing them from medal contention for the first time In Pan Am history.

USA versus Mexico
In the final match of the first round, the USA team defeated previously undefeated Mexico 87-58. The host team lead at the end of the first quarter by four points, and still lead at the half by three, but the USA outscored Mexico 35-15 in the third quarter to take a commanding lead. The leading scorer for the USA was again Breanna Stewart, with 17 points. Also scoring in double digits were Christine Flores, April Sykes and Emilie Johnson. Katelan Redmon was the leading rebounder on the team with ten rebounds. The USA finished fourth in their bracket, and go on to play Jamaica for seventh place.

USA versus Jamaica
After a slow start, the USA team put together an 18-2 run, and coasted to an easy victory over the Jamaica team by a score of 87-41, securing a seventh place overall finish in the event. Tavelyn James was the leading scorer with 19 points, while Shante Evans and Avery Warley each secured ten rebounds. Although still a high school student, Breanna Stewart earned spots in the USA Pan Am competition record books, setting single game rebounds record with 21 rebounds in a game. She also had nine blocks in the competition, putting her in second place, and her 88.5% free throw shooting is the fourth best ever.

2015
The 2015 Pan American Games were held from July 10 to 26, 2015 in Toronto, Ontario, Canada, with the official women's basketball events running from July 16 through July 20. The head coach of the USA team was Lisa Bluder, from the University of Iowa, and the two assistants were Michelle Clark-Heard of Western Kentucky University and Scott Rueck of Oregon State University.

USA versus Brazil

The opening game, held on July 16, was against Brazil. The USA started off strong opening up a 16-point lead in the second quarter but Brazil fought back and took a small two point lead in the third quarter with a 14–0 run. The USA team regrouped and one on an 11–2 run of their own to take over control of the game. Brazil wasn't finished, and cut the lead to four points with just under two minutes to go. The USA held Brazil to only one more score in the final two minutes and won the game 75–39.

USA versus Dominican Republic
The next day, the USA faced the Dominican Republic. By the end of the first quarter the USA was up 32–6 and cruised to an easy victory. The USA was able to give all 11 players double digit minutes. Five players, led by Stuart had double digit points. Sophie Brunner and Taya Reimer tied for the lead in rebounds with six. Kelsey Plum led the team in assists with five. The final score in favor of the USA was 94–55.

USA versus Puerto Rico
On Saturday, the USA completed the preliminary rounds with the game against Puerto Rico. The US a jump to an early 7–2 lead with two three-pointers by Jefferson, but Puerto Rico was hitting the three-pointers and trail by only a single .24–23 at the end of the first quarter. Coates and Stewart combined for the first 14 points of the second quarter, but Carla Cortijo Sanchez, who played college ball at the University of Texas, scored 10 points of her own to keep the Puerto Rican team close. Puerto Rico outscored the USA in the third quarter, and were only behind by three points at the beginning of the final quarter. Unfortunately, Cortijo sustained an injury and would be unable to play the rest of the game. She had scored 24 points when she left. Without her, the USA lead grew quickly to double digits than to 18 points. The USA ended with the win 93–77, which secured first place in their group and a place in the quarterfinals. Stewart and Coates ended with 24 and 23 points respectively and each recorded a double double. Jefferson led the team in assists with six.

USA versus Cuba
In the final preliminary game Cuba faced Canada. Although they were behind by 12 at the end of the third quarter, they mounted a furious comeback and almost pulled out the victory, losing a close game 71–68. That left Canada as the leading team in their group, and Cuba in second place facing the USA in the semifinal. USA fell behind early with Cuba scoring five points before the USA got on the board. The USA came back, but did not take the first lead until less than a minute left in the first quarter. The second quarter belong to Cuba as they outscored the US 20–8 to take an 11-point lead at the half. The USA was down by as much as 14 points early in the second half but the USA responded in the third quarter, outscoring Cuba 20–11. However, the lead still favored Cuba entering the fourth quarter. The game was tied several times in the fourth quarter, and Cuba had a small one point lead with a minute and a half to go in the game. Coates scored to give the USA a lead but Cuba responded to retake the lead. Then, with seconds left in the game Harper drove to the basket and did not score but was fouled. She hit both free throws to give the USA and one point game. Cuba had a final possession to take the lead back but Harper stole the ball to give the close victory to the USA 65–64.

USA versus Canada
The gold-medal game matched up USA against the host team Canada, in a sold out arena dominated by fans in red and white and waving the Canadian flag. The Canadian team, arm in arm, sang Oh Canada as the respective national anthems were played.

After trading baskets early the US edged out to a double-digit lead in the second quarter. However the Canadians, spurred on by the home crowd cheering, fought back and tied up the game at halftime. In the third quarter, it was Canada's time to shine as they outscore the US 26–15. The lead would reach as high as 18 points. The USA would fight back, but not all the way and Canada won the game and the gold-medal 81–73. It was Canada's first gold-medal in basketball in the Pan Am games. Nurse was the star for Canada with 33 points, hitting 11 of her 12 free-throw attempts in 10 of her 17 field-goal attempts including two of three three-pointers.

Coaches and results
The following people were head coaches, assistant coaches and managers at Pan American competitions:

Players 
The following players participated on Pan American teams:

See also
 Basketball at the Pan American Games
 USA Basketball
 USA women's national basketball team
 USA Women’s World University Games Team

Notes

References

External links
 USA Women's Pan American Games Team

Pan American team
Basketball at the Pan American Games
United States at the Pan American Games